Glenea beatrix is a species of beetle in the family Cerambycidae. It was described by James Thomson in 1879. It is known from the Philippines.

Subspecies
 Glenea beatrix beatrix Thomson, 1879
 Glenea beatrix obiensis Breuning, 1956

References

beatrix
Beetles described in 1879